Kumbakonam taluk is a taluk of Thanjavur district of the Indian state of Tamil Nadu. The headquarters of the taluk is the city of Kumbakonam.

Demographics
According to the 2011 census, the taluk of Kumbakonam had a population of 435,962 with 216,186  males and 219,776 females. There were 1017 women for every 1000 men. The taluk had a literacy rate of 78.05. Child population in the age group below 6 was 20,558 Males and 19,889 Females.

Villages

References 

Taluks of Thanjavur district